Robert Collier, 2nd Baron Monkswell (26 March 1845 – 22 December 1909), was a British Liberal politician. He was briefly Under-Secretary of State for War under The Earl of Rosebery in 1895. As a young man, he was a first-class cricketer active from 1866 to 1867. He was born and died in Chelsea.

Background
Monkswell was the eldest son of Robert Collier, 1st Baron Monkswell, and his wife Isabella Rose, daughter of William Rose. The artist John Collier was his younger brother. He was educated at Eton College, and matriculated at Trinity College, Cambridge in 1863, graduating LL.B. in 1867. He was admitted to the Inner Temple in 1864, and called to the bar in 1869.

Cricket career
Monkswell did not succeed to his title until 1886 and so was known as Robert Collier during his cricket career. He appeared for Cambridge Town Club (aka Cambridgeshire) in three first-class matches, scoring 33 runs with a highest score of 14.

Political career

Lord Monkswell entered the House of Lords on his father's death in 1886, and later served in the Liberal administrations of William Ewart Gladstone and Lord Rosebery as a Lord-in-waiting from 1892 to 1895 and as Under-Secretary of State for War from January to June 1895. He was also a member of the London County Council for the Progressive Party, and served as vice-chairman 1902–03, and Chairman 1903–04.

Family
Lord Monkswell married Mary Josephine Hardcastle, daughter of Joseph Hardcastle, in 1873. He died in December 1909, aged 64, and was succeeded in the barony by his eldest son Robert.
 
Lady Monkswell is known as a diarist. She died on 14 May 1930.

Arms

Notes

1845 births
1909 deaths
English cricketers
Cambridge Town Club cricketers
2
Robert
Liberal Party (UK) Lords-in-Waiting
Members of London County Council
Progressive Party (London) politicians